{{Infobox park
| name           = Gibbs Farm
| image          = Venet_88.5_Arc_x_8_2012_5.jpg
| image_size     = 
| image_alt      = 
| image_caption  = 88.5° ARC x 8 by Bernar Venet
| map            =  
| map_width      = 
| type           = private open-air sculpture park
| location       = Kaipara Harbour, New Zealand
| nearest_city   = Auckland
| coordinates    = 
| area           = 990 acres
| created        = 1991
| operator       = Alan Gibbs
| visitation_num = 
| status         = 
| designation    = 
| open           = 
It contains the largest collection of large-scale outdoor sculptures in New Zealand. It is the private art collection of New Zealand businessman Alan Gibbs; however, it is open to the public on select days throughout the year, usually once per month, on a bookings-essential basis. There is no entrance fee for the public to visit.

 Background 
Much of the artwork is commissioned and, as such, incorporates elements of the landscape into the artwork. The farm also includes several exotic animals such as emus and giraffes, a garage where visitors can glimpse the Gibbs Aquada through the window, and a full-scale wild west town complete with a saloon (in the installation called Grief). Grief was built through the inspiration of Gibbs' architect son-in-law, Noel Lane, who now cares for the property with Gibbs' daughter Amanda. The town is on a private area of the farm and is not open to the public.

The sculpture Electrum (for Len Lye)'', by Eric Orr, is the world's largest Tesla coil ( tall) and numerous artworks are large enough to be seen from satellite imagery at high magnification.

Gibbs is a major sponsor of ACT New Zealand, and most years, the party holds its annual conference at the Gibbs Farm.

Artworks

Photos of artwork

See also
List of sculpture parks

References

External links

 

Gardens in the Auckland Region
Sculpture gardens, trails and parks in New Zealand
Tourist attractions in the Auckland Region
Kaipara Harbour